Havelian Tehsil is an administrative subdivision (tehsil) of Abbottabad District in the Khyber Pakhtunkhwa province of Pakistan.

History
During British rule, the current district of Abbottabad was created as a Tehsil of Hazara District. After the independence of Pakistan it remained a tehsil of Hazara until 1981, when the old Abbottabad Tehsil became a district. Subsequently, the district was split into two tehsils, namely Abbottabad and Havelian.

Subdivisions

Municipal Committees
Havelian (Headquarters)

Cantonments
Havelian Cantonment

Union Councils
Bandi Attaikhan
Dana Noora Lan
Danah
Garhi Phulgran
Ghamir
Gorini
Havelian
Jhangran
Kokal
Langra
Langrial
Lora
Majohan
Nagri Totial
Nara
Rahi
Rajoya
Riala
Sajikot
Satora
Seer Gharbi
Seer Sharqi
Tajwal

References

Abbottabad District
Tehsils of Khyber Pakhtunkhwa